Betageri is a village in Belagavi district in the north west part of Karnataka state, India. The Kannada poet Betageri Krishnasharma was born here. Before the integration of Karnataka the whole of Belagavi district and other some districts of the north west were part of Bombay Karnataka.

References

Villages in Belagavi district